Ether Way: BBC Sessions 1975-77 is a live album by the progressive rock band Caravan released 1998.

Track listing
 "The Show of Our Lives" (John Murphy, Dave Sinclair) – 4:54
 "Stuck in a Hole" (Pye Hastings) – 3:15
 "The Dabsong Conshirto" (John Murphy, Dave Sinclair) – 12:32
 "All the Way" (Pye Hastings) – 6:33
 "A Very Smelly Grubby Little Oik/Bobbing Wide/Come on Back/Grubby Oik" (Pye Hastings) – 11:44
 "Behind You" (Pye Hastings) – 5:13
 "The Last Unicorn" (Geoffrey Richardson) – 5:34
 "Nightmare" (Pye Hastings) – 6:17
 "Better by Far" (Pye Hastings) – 4:48

 1 – 3 recorded for John Peel, 26.6.1975. First transmitted 3.7.1975
 4 – 5 recorded for John Peel, 6.5.1976. First transmitted 17.5.1976
 6 – 9 recorded for John Peel, 2.5.1977. First transmitted 10.5.1977

Personnel
Caravan
 Pye Hastings – vocals, guitar, vocals, liner notes
 Geoffrey Richardson – clarinet, flute, guitar, viola, spoons
 Dave Sinclair – keyboards, vocals (tracks: 1, 2, 3)
 Jan Schelhaas – keyboards (tracks: 4, 5)
 Mike Wedgwood – bass, conga (tracks: 1, 2, 3, 4, 5)
 Dek Messecar – bass (tracks: 6, 7, 8, 9)
 Richard Coughlan – drums

References

External links
 
 Caravan - Ether Way: BBC Sessions 1975-77 album credits & releases at AllMusic.com
 Caravan - Ether Way: BBC Sessions 1975-77 album releases & credits at Discogs.com

Caravan (band) live albums
1998 live albums
1998 compilation albums
BBC Radio recordings